Jamesville is a town in Martin County, North Carolina, United States. The population was 491 at the 2010 census.

Geography

Demographics

As of the census of 2000, there were 502 people, 199 households, and 140 families residing in the town. The population density was 375.1 people per square mile (144.6/km2). There were 233 housing units at an average density of 174.1 per square mile (100.1/km2). The racial makeup of the town was 64.94% of White, 33.86% African American, 1.00% from other races, and 0.20% from two or more races. Hispanic or Latino of any race were 1.20% of the population.

There were 199 households, out of which 32.2% had children under the age of 18 living with them, 46.2% were married couples living together, 18.6% had a female householder with no husband present, and 29.6% were non-families. 27.6% of all households were made up of individuals, and 16.1% had someone living alone who was 65 years of age or older. The average household Aaron size was 2.52 and the average family size was 3.04.

In the town, the population was spread out, with 28.1% under the age of 18, 6.2% from 18 to 24, 25.1% from 25 to 44, 22.1% from 45 to 64, and 18.5% who were 65 years of age or older. The median age was 38 years. For every 100 females, there were 92.3 males. For every 100 females age 18 and over, there were 81.4 males.

The median income for a household in the town was $28,438, and the median income for a family was $32,813. Males had a median income of $32,045 versus $20,208 for females. The per capita income for the town was $16,682. About 21.5% of families and 19.7% of the population were below the poverty line, including 31.7% of those under age 18 and 13.4% of those age 65 or over.

Education
Jamesville Elementary School
Northeast Regional School Of Biotechnology & Agriscience

In Literature and Fiction
The town of Jamesville is featured in Don Brown's historical fiction novel Destiny, the prequel to Brown's Navy Justice Series.

Notable person
Jimmy Brown - Major League Baseball infielder with the St. Louis Cardinals, Major League Baseball All-Star Game 1942, World Series Champion, 1942.

References

Towns in Martin County, North Carolina
Towns in North Carolina